Scene (from Greek  ) may refer to:

Arts, entertainment, and media

Music
Scene (subculture), a youth subculture from the early 2000s characterized by a distinct music and style

Groups and performers
 The Scene who recorded the song "Scenes (from Another World)"
 Scene, the stage name used by Japanese Punk guitarist Minoru Kojima
 Selena Gomez & the Scene, an American band
 The Scene (Canadian band), a late 1960s psychedelic Canadian band
 The Scene (Dutch band), a Dutch band formed by Thé Lau

Albums
 Scene, a 2005 noise album by Merzbow
 Scenes (album), a 1992 music album by Marty Friedman
 The Scene (Eskimo Callboy album), an Eskimo Callboy album
 The Scene, the debut album of The Scene

Other uses in music
 S.C.E.N.E. Music Festival, an annual festival held in downtown St. Catharines, Ontario, Canada
 "The Scene" (song), a song by Canadian band Big Sugar from their 1998 album Heated

Periodicals
 Scene (see London Advertiser, a bi-weekly entertainment magazine published for London, Ontario, Canada
 Cleveland Scene, an alternative newspaper in Cleveland, Ohio, United States

Television
 CBC News: The Scene, a Canadian entertainment news show on CBC, hosted by Jelena Adzic
 Scene (TV series), a BBC drama anthology for teenagers
 "The Scene" (Entourage), Entourage episode
 The Scene (miniseries), a miniseries about unauthorised distribution of films and the warez scene
 The Scene, WGPR-TV Detroit dance show, October 1975 to December 1987, replaced by The New Dance Show

Other uses in arts, entertainment, and media
 Scene (performing arts), a part of the story held in a single location
 The Scene (play), a black comedy written by Theresa Rebeck

Brands and enterprises
 Scene Club, London music venue, opened in 1963, associated with 1960s mod youth culture
 The Scene (performance venue), New York City nightclub operated by Steve Paul between 1964 and 1970; commonly known as "Steve Paul's The Scene"

Other uses
 Scene (BDSM), the setting where BDSM activity takes place, as well as the activity itself
 Scene+, a Canadian loyalty program operated by Scotiabank and Cineplex Entertainment
 Scene (perception), a set of information that can flow from a physical environment into a perceptual system via sensory transduction
 Warez scene, an underground community of people that specialize in the distribution of copyrighted material

See also

 Demoscene, an international computer art subculture focused on producing demos.
 
 
 Cene (disambiguation)
 Scenery (disambiguation)
 Scenic (disambiguation)
 Seen (disambiguation)